For the cycling competitions at the 2016 Summer Olympics, the following qualification systems are in place.

Summary

Track cycling

An NOC is entitled to enter a single team in each of the four team events. An NOC without a team in the relevant team event may qualify up to two places in sprint and keirin, and one place in omnium; an NOC with a team may enter that number from its team resources, for a total of twenty three quota places, an increase from the 2012 games which had a one rider per event limit in sprint and keirin; however, a limit of 15 riders (8 men, 7 women ) is placed on  each NOC, with the possibility of drafting in two further riders from other cycling events. For certain countries, therefore, the number of quota places earned will significantly exceed the numbers of riders qualified; in effect,  members of team events will 'double up', for team sprint athletes in sprint and keirin, and team pursuit athletes in omnium.

Road cycling

Similarly, the cyclists who compete in the road time trial must also compete in the road race event; thus an NOC may win 2 quota places, but be allowed to take only one rider.

Legend
TS – Team Sprint
KE – Keirin
SP – Sprint
TP – Team Pursuit
OM – Omnium
RR – Road Race
TT – Individual Time Trial
Q – Quotas
R – Riders

Timeline
The following is a timeline of the qualification events for the cycling events at the 2016 Summer Olympics.

Road cycling

Men's road race

* Quota reduced to the number of riders in the ranking of the respective tour

** Quota reduced by one to accommodate for the individual qualifiers on the same tour

*** Additional quota places earned on the continental tour for countries with quota reduction due to lack of ranked riders on the world tour

Men's individual time trial

Women's road race

* Quota reduced by one to accommodate for the individual qualifiers on the same tour

Women's individual time trial

Track cycling

Men's team sprint
Teams must be composed of 3 riders.

Men's sprint

Men's Keirin

Men's team pursuit
Teams must be composed of 4 riders.

Men's Omnium

Women's team sprint
Teams must be composed of 2 riders.

Women's sprint

Women's Keirin

Women's team pursuit
Teams must be composed of 4 riders.

Women's Omnium

Mountain biking

Men's cross-country race

Women's cross-country race

 – South Africa won the continental quotas in men's and women's mountain bike, but decided not to accept them. South African sports confederation and Olympic Committee (SASCOC) and Cycling South Africa (CSA) made an agreement on the Rio 2016 Olympics qualification criteria that the Continental Qualification route will not be considered.

BMX

Men's BMX

Women's BMX

References

Qualification for the 2016 Summer Olympics
Cycling qualification for the Summer Olympics
Qualification